Sofia University is a private for-profit university in Palo Alto, California. It was originally founded as the California Institute of Transpersonal Psychology by Robert Frager and James Fadiman in 1975.

History

California Institute of Transpersonal Psychology (1975–1986)
The institution was originally known as the California Institute of Transpersonal Psychology, one of several transpersonally-oriented institutions formed in the 1970s. The founders, Robert Frager and James Fadiman, wanted to offer the perspectives of east/west psychology alongside personal, therapeutic and spiritual disciplines, all within a community context.

In 1980 Jungian analyst June Singer joined the core faculty at the institute, where she took the position as director of the clinical training program. By the mid-eighties the school was located in Menlo Park and offered a master's degree and doctoral degree in Transpersonal psychology.

Institute of Transpersonal Psychology (1986–2012)
In 1986, there was a minor change of name, and the institution emerged as the Institute of Transpersonal Psychology.

By 1989, the institute had grown to offer a range of residential masters and doctoral programs, as well as external masters and certificate programs.  It also oversaw the activities of a Transpersonal Counseling Center and hosted the Spiritual Emergence Network.

In 1992, the institute was granted candidacy by WASC. Also, that same year, William G. Braud and Rosemarie Anderson joined the core faculty at the institution. Braud later served as research director at the institute, as well as co-director of the institute's William James Center for Consciousness Studies.

In 1997, the institute was given initial accreditation by WASC. In 1998, Braud and Anderson released the book Transpersonal Research Methods for the Social Sciences: Honoring Human Experience, which sought to establish the field of transpersonal (or transformative) research methods.

In 2002, it was reported that 410 students were enrolled in the fall semester at the institute. This included students enrolled in the institute's online program. At this time the institute offered programs in psychology and counseling, with an emphasis on both traditional and non-traditional psychological and spiritual models of instruction. Other certificate programs were also gradually established, such as the certificate in Spiritual Direction. WASC accreditation was reaffirmed in 2007 and in 2011 Neal King was appointed president of the institute.

Other academic profiles that were connected to the Institute of Transpersonal Psychology includes Kari Hennigan, who conducted studies in ecopsychology, and Fred Luskin, who was professor of clinical psychology.

Sofia University (2012–present)
In 2012, there was a new change of name, and also a change of academic profile. The Board of Trustees decided that the new official name of the institution was to be Sofia University. The re-branding came with a transition from institute to university, and the institution now offered both undergraduate and graduate programs. Academic programs became structured according to three main orientations: the Graduate School of Transpersonal Studies, the Graduate School of Clinical & Spiritual Psychology and the School of Undergraduate Studies. In the mainstream press the institution was, by this time, associated with the concept of spiritual psychology.

In 2013, the school had 526 full-time-equivalent students. Liz Li was appointed president in 2014, and became the first female president of the institution. Her successor was Barry Ryan.

As of 2015 the university was reaccredited for an additional seven years by the WASC Senior College and University Commission. Dr. Peter Bemski became president in January 2018.

Academics
The university comprises three schools: the Institute of Transpersonal Psychology, the Institute of Applied and Professional Programs and Global College
.
 
The school has broadened to include studies in computer science, including artificial intelligence, human computer interaction, big data and software design; business leadership and management and offers three degree programs in the Chinese Language (MBA, MATP, Ph.D) applying transpersonal principles to real-world disciplines.

Notes
a. New York Times correction as of August 17, 2012, states that the original article (Otterman, 2012), in some editions, misidentified Sofia University/Institute of Transpersonal Psychology in Palo Alto (California) with the Institute for Transpersonal Studies in Santa Cruz (California).

See also 

 Transpersonal
 Transpersonal psychology

References

External links
 

Organizations based in Palo Alto, California
Universities and colleges in Santa Clara County, California
Educational institutions established in 1975
Schools accredited by the Western Association of Schools and Colleges
Buildings and structures in Palo Alto, California
Transpersonal studies
For-profit universities and colleges in the United States
Private universities and colleges in California